Jan Cornelis "Jan Kees" de Jager (born 10 February 1969) is a former Dutch politician of the Christian Democratic Appeal (CDA) party and businessman. He was State Secretary for Finance between 2007 and 2010 and later Minister for Finance between 2010 and 2012.

Biography

Early life
De Jager studied at the Nyenrode Business University where he received his Bachelor of Business Administration degree in 1990. Subsequently, he studied at the Erasmus University Rotterdam where he obtained a Master of Science degree in Economic sociology and Business economics in 1994. He also obtained a Master of Laws degree at the same university in 1996.

In 1992, while still at university, De Jager founded Information technology company Spectra Vision. All business activities were handed over to ISM eCompany (Innovative Solutions in Media) in 1997, the company of which De Jager was CEO until his appointment to the cabinet on 22 February 2010. In 2008, Sana Commerce (B2B e-commerce software vendor) has become a subsidiary of ISM eCompany.

Besides his work as managing partner of the Rotterdam internet agency ISM eCompany (which he co-founded in 1992) and Sana Commerce (B2B e-commerce software) from 2008, De Jager is socially involved in different activities. He was a member of the executive board of the Christian Democratic Appeal and organizations of various social and economic issues. For his contribution to the success of the company he worked and his efforts in various ICT and innovative ancillary, De Jager received the ICT Personality 2006 Award of interbranch ICT ~ Office.

In October 2019, KPN announced that De Jager would step down as finance chief and will be replaced by Chris Figee.

Politics

State secretary for Finance

De Jager was State secretary for Finance in the Fourth Balkenende cabinet from 22 February 2007 to 23 February 2010. His portfolio was Fiscal Affairs.

De Jager took part in the 2008 G-20 Washington summit on financial crisis in Washington on 15 and 16 November 2008. De Jager would actually participate as acting Minister of Finance in the program of the Finance ministers. After consultation with the White House it was decided that De Jager (the highest representative of the Dutch government in Washington, D.C.) could participate in the summit as head of government. De Jager advocated by the Dutch contribution to the need to improve monitoring in a more prominent role of the International Monetary Fund and World Bank.

Minister of Finance
On 23 February 2010 following the resignation of Wouter Bos, and with him all the Labour Party members from the Fourth Balkenende cabinet, De Jager became Minister of Finance. He worked on the 2011 budget and on 14 October 2010 De Jager remained as Cabinet Minister in the First Rutte cabinet with Frans Weekers as State secretary. On 26 February 2012 former Minister of Finance Onno Ruding told journalist and television host Eva Jinek he had regular contact with De Jager on specific topics.

Personal
In 2011, De Jager said that he is in a relationship with a man.

Decorations

References

External links

Official
  Mr.Drs. J.C. (Jan Kees) de Jager Parlement & Politiek

1969 births
Living people
Businesspeople from Rotterdam
Businesspeople in information technology
Christian Democratic Appeal politicians
Dutch chief executives in the technology industry
Dutch corporate directors
Dutch fiscal jurists
Dutch members of the Dutch Reformed Church
Erasmus University Rotterdam alumni
Gay politicians
Dutch LGBT businesspeople
LGBT cabinet members of the Netherlands
LGBT Calvinist and Reformed Christians
LGBT conservatism
LGBT members of the Parliament of the Netherlands
Members of the House of Representatives (Netherlands)
Ministers of Finance of the Netherlands
Nyenrode Business University alumni
Officers of the Order of Orange-Nassau
People from Kapelle
Politicians from Rotterdam
Protestant Church Christians from the Netherlands
State Secretaries for Finance of the Netherlands
20th-century Dutch businesspeople
20th-century Dutch economists
21st-century Dutch businesspeople
21st-century Dutch economists
21st-century Dutch politicians